Jane Darwell (born Patti Woodard; October 15, 1879 – August 13, 1967) was an American actress of stage, film, and television. With appearances in more than 100 major movies spanning half a century, Darwell is perhaps best remembered for her poignant portrayal of the matriarch and leader of the Joad family in the film adaptation of John Steinbeck's The Grapes of Wrath, for which she received the Academy Award for Best Supporting Actress. She has a star on the Hollywood Walk of Fame.

Early life
Born to William Robert Woodard, president of the Louisville Southern Railroad, and Ellen Booth Woodard in Palmyra, Missouri, Darwell originally intended to become a circus rider, then later an opera singer. Her father, however, objected to those career plans, so she compromised by becoming an actress, changing her name to Darwell to avoid sullying the family name.

The Jane Darwell Birthplace was added to the National Register of Historic Places in 1984.

Woodard vs. Woodward
Some sources give Darwell's birth name as Patti Woodward. They include Women in World History: A Biographical Encyclopedia, Screen World Presents the Encyclopedia of Hollywood Film Actors: From the silent era to 1965, Missouri Biographical Dictionary, Screen World 1968, The New Biographical Dictionary of Film, and Dictionary of Missouri Biography.

Career

Darwell studied voice culture and the piano, followed by dramatics. At one point, she decided to enter a convent, then changed her mind and became an actress. She began acting in theater productions in Chicago and made her first film appearance in 1913. She appeared in almost 20 films over the next two years, then returned to the stage. After a 15-year absence from films, she appeared in Tom Sawyer (1930), and her career as a Hollywood character actress began. Short, stout and plain, she was quickly cast in a succession of films, usually as the mother of one of the main characters. She also appeared in five Shirley Temple films, usually as the housekeeper or grandmother.

She won an Academy Award for Best Supporting Actress as Ma Joad in The Grapes of Wrath (1940), a role she was given at the insistence of Henry Fonda, the film's star. A contract player with 20th Century Fox, Darwell was memorably cast in The Ox-Bow Incident, and occasionally starred in B movies and played featured parts in scores of major films.

Darwell had noted appearances on the stage as well; in 1944, she was popular in the stage comedy Suds in Your Eye, in which she played an Irishwoman who had inherited a junkyard.

By the end of her career, she had appeared in more than 170 films, including Huckleberry Finn (1931),  Jesse James (1939), Gone with the Wind (1939), The Devil and Daniel Webster (1941), The Ox-Bow Incident (1943), and My Darling Clementine (1946).

On the television front, Darwell was among the guest stars on an episode of Faye Emerson's Wonderful Town, a variety series that aired on CBS from 1951 to 1952 in which hostess Faye Emerson visits a different city each week to accent the local music. In 1954, Darwell appeared with Andy Clyde in the episode "Santa's Old Suit" of the series The Pepsi-Cola Playhouse. This same episode was re-run the following Christmas 1955 on Studio 57. In 1959, she appeared with child actor Roger Mobley in the episode "Mr. Rush's Secretary" on Buckskin, starring Tom Nolan and Sally Brophy. That same year she appeared in the TV Western  series Wagon Train as “Mrs. Anderson” in the S2E23 episode “The Vivian Carter Story”. She guest starred on John Bromfield's crime drama Sheriff of Cochise.

On July 27, 1961, Darwell appeared as Grandmother McCoy in an episode of the sitcom The Real McCoys. In the story, the series characters played by Walter Brennan, Richard Crenna, and Kathleen Nolan return to fictitious Smokey Corners, West Virginia for Grandmother McCoy's 100th birthday gathering. Darwell was 15 years older than "son" Walter Brennan. Pat Buttram and Henry Jones appeared in this episode as Cousin Carl and Jed McCoy, respectively.

On February 8, 1960, Darwell received a star on the Hollywood Walk of Fame for her contributions to the motion-picture industry; it is located at 6735 Hollywood Boulevard. 

In her mid-eighties, Darwell was semi-retired from acting, other than a rare television guest appearance. She had recently moved into the Motion Picture Country Home because of her advanced age and feebleness. When Disney offered her the role of the Bird Woman in Mary Poppins (1964), Darwell declined the role. Walt Disney, still insistent, personally drove to the retirement home to plead with her and she agreed to take the part. It was her last acting role. In this pivotal scene in the movie, the Bird Woman at the steps of St Paul's Cathedral Square sells bags of bread crumbs to passers-by to feed the pigeons. The "poignant" song "Feed the Birds" was sung by Julie Andrews, as a hymn-like lullaby.

Death

During her last years, Darwell was in poor health. She died August 13, 1967, at the Motion Picture & Television Country House and Hospital from a myocardial infarction at the age of 87 and her body was interred at the Forest Lawn Memorial Park in Glendale, California.

Partial filmography

Brewster's Millions (1914) as Mrs. Dan De Mille
The Master Mind (1914) as Milwaukee Sadie
The Only Son (1914) as Mrs. Brainerd
The Man on the Box (1914) as Mrs. Chadwick
Ready Money (1914) as Mrs. Tyler
Rose of the Rancho (1914) as Senora Castro Kenton / Juanita's Mother
The Hypocrites (1915) as Madam (uncredited)
The Goose Girl (1915) as Irma
After Five (1915) as Mrs. Russell - Aunt Diddy
The Rug Maker's Daughter (1915) as Mrs. Van Buren
The Reform Candidate (1915) as Mrs. Haggerty
Little Church Around the Corner (1923) as Anxious Woman at Mine Disaster (uncredited)
Tom Sawyer (1930) as Widow Douglas
Fighting Caravans (1931) as Pioneer Woman (uncredited)
Huckleberry Finn (1931) as Widow Douglas
Ladies of the Big House (1931) as Mrs. Turner
No One Man (1932) as Patient (uncredited)
Young America (1932) as Schoolteacher (uncredited)
The Strange Case of Clara Deane (1932) as Mortimer's Wife (uncredited)
Back Street (1932) as Mrs. Adolph Schmidt
Washington Merry-Go-Round (1932) as Alice's Aunt (uncredited)
Hot Saturday (1932) as Mrs Ida Brock
Women Won't Tell (1932) as Mrs. Walter Robinson
Air Hostess (1933) as Ma Kearns
The Past of Mary Holmes (1933)
Child of Manhattan (1933) as Mrs. McGonegle
Murders in the Zoo (1933) as Banquet Guest (uncredited)
Bondage (1933) as Mrs. Elizabeth Wharton
The Girl in 419 (1933) as Nurse Esmond (uncredited)
Emergency Call (1933) as Head Nurse Brown (uncredited)
Jennie Gerhardt (1933) as Boardinghouse Keeper (uncredited)
Bed of Roses (1933) as Mrs. Webster - Head Prison Matron (uncredited)
Before Dawn (1933) as Mrs. Marble
He Couldn't Take It (1933) as Mrs. Case
One Sunday Afternoon (1933) as Mrs. Lind
Ann Vickers (1933) as Mrs. Gage (uncredited)
Aggie Appleby, Maker of Men (1933) as Mrs. Spence - Landlady (uncredited)
Only Yesterday (1933) as Mrs. Lane
Design for Living (1933) as Curtis' Housekeeper
Roman Scandals (1933) as Roman Spa Proprietress (uncredited)
King for a Night (1933) as Mrs. Williams (uncredited)
Cross Country Cruise (1934) as Mrs. O'Hara (uncredited)
Fashions of 1934 (1934) as Customer at Maison Elegance (uncredited)
Wonder Bar (1934) as Baroness (uncredited)
Heat Lightning (1934) as Gladys
David Harum (1934) as Mrs. Woolsey (uncredited)
Journal of a Crime (1934) as Dinner Guest (uncredited)
Once to Every Woman (1934) as Mrs. Wood
Finishing School (1934) as Maude - interns' Receptionist (uncredited)
The Scarlet Empress (1934) as Miss Cardell, Sophia's Nurse (uncredited)
Change of Heart (1934) as Mrs. McGowan
Let's Talk It Over (1934) as Mrs. O'Keefe
The Most Precious Thing in Life (1934) as Mrs. O'Day
Blind Date (1934) as Ma Taylor
Million Dollar Ransom (1934) as Ma McGarry (uncredited)
Embarrassing Moments (1934) as Mrs. Stuckelberger
One Night of Love (1934) as Mrs. Barrett - Mary's Mother (uncredited)
Desirable (1934) as Frederick's Mother (uncredited)
Wake Up and Dream (1934) as Landlady
Happiness Ahead (1934) as Mrs. Davis - the Landlady
Tomorrow's Youth (1934) as Mary O'Brien
The Firebird (1934) as Mrs. Miller - Apartment House Tenant (uncredited)
The White Parade (1934) as Miss 'Sailor' Roberts
Gentlemen Are Born (1934) as Landlady (uncredited)
Bright Eyes (1934) as Elizabeth Higgins
One More Spring (1935) as Mrs. Mary Sweeney
McFadden's Flats (1935) as Nora McFadden
Life Begins at 40 (1935) as Ida Harris
Curly Top (1935) as Mrs. Henrietta Denham
Navy Wife (1935) as Mrs. Louise Keats
Metropolitan (1935) as Grandma (uncredited)
We're Only Human (1935) as Mrs. Walsh
Paddy O'Day (1936) as Dora
The Country Doctor (1936) as Mrs. Graham
The First Baby (1936) as Mrs. Ellis
Captain January (1936) as Mrs. Eliza Croft
Private Number (1936) as Mrs. Meecham
Little Miss Nobody (1936) as Martha Bradley
The Poor Little Rich Girl (1936) as Woodward
White Fang (1936) as Maud Mahoney
Star for a Night (1936) as Mrs. Martha Lind
Ramona (1936) as Aunt Ri Hyar
Craig's Wife (1936) as Mrs. Harold
Laughing at Trouble (1936) as Glory Bradford
Love Is News (1937) as Mrs. Flaherty
Nancy Steele Is Missing! (1937) as Mrs. Mary Flaherty
The Great Hospital Mystery (1937) as Miss Sarah Keats
Fifty Roads to Town (1937) as Mrs. Henry
Slave Ship (1937) as Mrs. Marlowe
The Singing Marine (1937) as "Ma" Marine
Wife, Doctor and Nurse (1937) Mrs. Krueger
Dangerously Yours (1937) as Aunt Cynthia Barton
Change of Heart (1938) as Mrs. Thompson
The Jury's Secret (1938) as Mrs. Sheldon
Battle of Broadway (1938) as Mrs. Rogers
Three Blind Mice (1938) as Mrs. Killan
Little Miss Broadway (1938) as Miss Hutchins
Time Out for Murder (1938) as Polly - Helen's Supervisor
Five of a Kind (1938) as Mrs. Waldron
Up the River (1938) as Mrs. Graham
Jesse James (1939) as Mrs. Samuels
Inside Story (1939) as Aunt Mary Perkins
The Zero Hour (1939) as Sophie
Unexpected Father (1939) as Mrs. Callahan
Grand Jury Secrets (1939) as Mrs. Keefe
The Rains Came (1939) as Aunt Phoebe - Mrs. Smiley
20,000 Men a Year (1939) as Mrs. Allen
Gone with the Wind (1939) as Mrs. Merriwether
Miracle on Main Street (1939) as Mrs. Herman
The Grapes of Wrath (1940) as Ma Joad
Untamed (1940) as Mrs. Maggie Moriarty
Brigham Young (1940) as Eliza Kent
Youth Will Be Served (1940) as Supervisor Stormer
Chad Hanna (1940) as Mrs. Huguenine
Thieves Fall Out (1941) as Grandma Allen
Private Nurse (1941) as Miss Adams
The Devil and Daniel Webster (1941) as Ma Stone
All Through the Night (1942) as Mrs. 'Ma' Donahue
Young America (1942) as Grandmother Nora Campbell
On the Sunny Side (1942) as Annie
Small Town Deb (1942) as Katie
It Happened in Flatbush (1942) as Mrs. Maguire
Men of Texas (1942) as Mrs.Scott aka Aunt Hattie
The Loves of Edgar Allan Poe (1942) as Mrs. Mariah Clemm
Highways by Night (1942) as Grandma Fogarty
The Great Gildersleeve (1942) as Aunt Emma Forrester
Gildersleeve's Bad Day (1943) as Aunt Emma Forrester
The Ox-Bow Incident (1943) as Ma Grier
Stage Door Canteen (1943) as herself
Government Girl (1943) as Miss Trask (uncredited)
Tender Comrade (1943) as Mrs. Henderson
Reckless Age (1944) as Mrs. Connors
The Impatient Years (1944) as Minister's Wife
Music in Manhattan (1944) as Mrs. Pearson
She's a Sweetheart (1944) as Mom
Sunday Dinner for a Soldier (1944) as Mrs. Helen Dobson
I Live in Grosvenor Square (1945) as Mrs. Patterson
Captain Tugboat Annie (1945) as Tugboat Annie
The Dark Horse (1946) as Aunt Hattie
Three Wise Fools (1946) as Sister Mary Brigid
My Darling Clementine (1946) as Kate Nelson
Keeper of the Bees (1947) as Mrs. Ferris
The Red Stallion (1947) as Mrs. Aggie Curtis
Train to Alcatraz (1948) as Aunt Ella
3 Godfathers (1948) as Miss Florie
Red Canyon (1949) as Aunt Jane
The Daughter of Rosie O'Grady (1950) as Mrs. Murphy
Wagon Master (1950) as Sister Ledyard
Caged (1950) as Isolation Matron
Surrender (1950) as Molly Hale
Redwood Forest Trail (1950) as Hattie Hickory
Three Husbands (1950) as Mrs. Wurdeman
The Second Face (1950) as Mrs. Lockridge
Father's Wild Game (1950) as Minverva Bobbin
The Lemon Drop Kid (1951) as Nellie Thursday
Excuse My Dust (1951) as Mrs. Belden
Journey into Light (1951) as Mack
We're Not Married! (1952) as Mrs. Bush
The Sun Shines Bright (1953) as Mrs. Aurora Ratchitt
It Happens Every Thursday (1953) as Mrs. Eva Spatch
Affair with a Stranger (1953) as Ma Stanton
The Bigamist (1953) as Mrs. Connelley
Hit the Deck (1955) as Jenny
There's Always Tomorrow (1955) as Mrs. Rogers
A Life at Stake (1955) as Landlady
Girls in Prison (1956) as Matron Jamieson
The Last Hurrah (1958) as Delia Boylan
Hound-Dog Man (1959) as Grandma Wilson
Mary Poppins (1964) as The Bird Woman (final film role)

See also
 List of actors with Academy Award nominations

References

Further reading

External links

 
 
 

1879 births
1967 deaths
Actresses from Missouri
American film actresses
American stage actresses
Best Supporting Actress Academy Award winners
People from Marion County, Missouri
Actresses from Los Angeles
Burials at Forest Lawn Memorial Park (Glendale)
20th-century American actresses
20th Century Studios contract players